The Urubamba mountain range (possibly from Quechua uru spider, pampa a plain) lies in the Cusco Region in Peru. It extends in a northwesterly direction between 13°08' and 13°17'S and 71°58' and 72°16'W for about 30 km.

Toponyms 
Most of the names in the range originate from Quechua and Aymara. They used to be spelled according to a mainly Spanish-based orthography which is incompatible with the normalized spellings of these languages and Law 29735 which regulates the 'use, preservation, development, recovery, promotion and diffusion of the original languages of Peru'. According to Article 20 of Decreto Supremo No 004-2016-MC (Supreme Decree) which approves the Regulations to Law 29735, published in the  official newspaper El Peruano on July 22, 2016, adequate spellings of the toponyms in the normalized alphabets of the indigenous languages must progressively be proposed with the aim of standardizing the namings used by the IGN. The IGN realizes the necessary changes in the official maps of Peru. These changes are part of a process to promote and preserve the indigenous languages.

Hints to wrong spellings are terms containing hua and hui (instead of wa and wi), "e", "o", "ca", "cu", "qu"  or diphthongs among others.

Mountains 
Other mountains are listed below:

 Chicón, 
 Sirihuani, 
 Halancoma, 
 Huajayhuillca, 
 Marconi,  
 Pumahuanca, 
 Ancasmarca, 
 Condorhuachana, 
 Huamanchoque, 
 Ccerayoc, 
 Capacsaya, 
 Huacratanca, 
 Ajosune, 
 Huarmaripayoc, 
 Pitusiray, 
 Canchacanchajasa, 
 Azulorjo, 
 Chaquicocha, 
 Parorjo, 
 Apurinru, 
 Pucajasa, 
 Pumacallanca, 
 Yana Orjo, 
 Yanaorcco (Lares), 
 Pucaorjo, 
 Sutoc, 
 Patacancha,  
 Coscojahuarina, 
 Jatun Huiscana, 
 Llamayojcasa, 
 Coscojahuarina (Calca), 
 Quellorjo, 
 Puquiopata, 
 Yurac Orjo, 
 Maquimaquiyoc,

References

Mountain ranges of Peru
Mountain ranges of Cusco Region